Maureen Nisima (born 30 July 1981 in Bondy, Seine-Saint-Denis) is a French épée fencer, who won the bronze medal at the 2004 Summer Olympics alongside Laura Flessel-Colovic, Hajnalka Kiraly Picot and Sarah Daninthe.

She also won the silver medal in the épée team event at the 2006 World Fencing Championships after losing to China in the final. She accomplished this with her teammates Marysa Baradji-Duchene, Hajnalka Kiraly Picot and Laura Flessel-Colovic.

Other achievements
 2006 European Seniors Fencing Championship, épée

References

1981 births
Living people
Sportspeople from Bondy
French people of Martiniquais descent
French female épée fencers
Fencers at the 2004 Summer Olympics
Olympic fencers of France
Olympic bronze medalists for France
Olympic medalists in fencing
Medalists at the 2004 Summer Olympics
21st-century French women